Bert Miller may refer to:

 Bert H. Miller (1876–1949), American politician from Idaho
 Bert Miller (footballer) (1880–1953), English footballer
 Bert Miller (baseball) (1875–1937), Major League Baseball pitcher
 Bert Miller, CPUSA party name during 1920s of Benjamin Mandel (1887–1973), director of research for HUAC

See also
 Bertie Miller (born 1949), footballer
 Albert Miller (disambiguation)
 Hubert Miller (1918–2000), bobsledder
 Robert Miller (disambiguation)